Jalhalli  is a village in the southern state of Karnataka, India. It is located in the Devadurga taluk of Raichur district in Karnataka.

Demographics
As of 2001 India census, Jalhalli had a population of 10,381 with 5,379 males and 5,002 females.

See also
 Raichur
 Districts of Karnataka

References

External links
 http://Raichur.nic.in/

 Cities and towns in Raichur district